Cornelis Constant Maria (Kees) Vendrik (30 January 1963 in Nijmegen) is a member of the Netherlands Court of Audit.

Political life
Vendrik was a member of the House of Representatives for GreenLeft. He used to be the party's specialist on the economy, finance, the health care system and international trade. He is an advocate of the use of open source software by government agencies.

Before politics
Vendrik studied political science at the Radboud University Nijmegen and the University of Amsterdam. After his studies he worked for the debating centre De Balie in Amsterdam and as assistant of GreenLeft parliamentary party in the House of Representatives.

External links

 Profile on parlement.com

1963 births
Living people
GroenLinks politicians
Members of the Court of Audit (Netherlands)
Members of the House of Representatives (Netherlands)
Pacifist Socialist Party politicians
People from Nijmegen
21st-century Dutch politicians